Russ Bray (born 22 June 1957) is an English darts referee who works for the Professional Darts Corporation (PDC). He is also known as "The Voice", due to his unique style of calling and his shouty voice. Russ was previously a traffic cop.

Darts career 
According to Bray himself, his calling career began one night when the regular caller failed to show for a county match. Bray was then contracted to call for the PDC in 1996 and was given his debut at the World Matchplay in Blackpool. He was the caller when Phil Taylor hit the PDC's first-ever televised nine-darter in 2002 at the same event. He has called seven more nine-darters live on TV since then including the first televised nine-darter outside of Europe by Mervyn King in Johannesburg, South Africa.

Bray was a county player for Hertfordshire and subsequently played on the pro circuit. He teamed up with Eric Bristow to win the Norway and Finland pairs.

Bray also hit the bullseye on a standard dartboard from 10 feet, outdoors, on Blackpool's North Pier, thus achieving a Guinness World Record in the process. Bray beat the day's previous best of 9' 6" which was achieved by fellow PDC official Scott Gibling.

Other work 
Bray has made use of his raspy voice in various other forms of media. He was the referee in the PDC's first ever video game, PDC World Championship Darts and also became the voice of Feasters, a microwave food chain.  He has also provided voiceover work for advertising from Coral, Ladbrokes, Cash Converters & McCoy's Crisps. Additionally, he has also provided his voice and his name to Russ Bray Darts, a mobile app. Bray has since made an appearance in boxing as the voice on Sky Sports Fight Night in October.

Personal life 
Bray currently resides in Soham, Cambridgeshire with his wife, Sue.

He is a lifelong supporter of football club West Ham United.

References

External links 
 
 Official website (archived)

Living people
1957 births
Darts people
People from South Ockendon